The Symphony No. 2 in D major, Op. 36, is a symphony in four movements written by Ludwig van Beethoven between 1801 and 1802. The work is dedicated to Karl Alois, Prince Lichnowsky.

Background
Beethoven's Second Symphony was mostly written during Beethoven's stay at Heiligenstadt in 1802, at a time when his deafness was becoming more pronounced and he began to realize that it might be incurable. The work was premiered in the Theater an der Wien in Vienna on 5 April 1803, and was conducted by the composer. During that same concert, the Third Piano Concerto and the oratorio Christ on the Mount of Olives were also debuted. It is one of the last works of Beethoven's early period.

Beethoven wrote the Second Symphony without a standard minuet; instead, a scherzo took its place, giving the composition even greater scope and energy. The scherzo and the finale are filled with Beethovenian musical jokes, which shocked the sensibilities of many contemporary critics. One Viennese critic for the Zeitung fuer die elegante Welt (Newspaper for the Elegant World) famously wrote of the Symphony that it was "a hideously writhing, wounded dragon that refuses to die, but writhing in its last agonies and, in the fourth movement, bleeding to death."

Instrumentation
The symphony is scored for two flutes, two oboes, two clarinets in A, two bassoons, two horns in D, E and A, two trumpets in D (first, third and fourth movements only), timpani (first, third and fourth movements only) and strings. 

Ferdinand Ries, working under Beethoven, made a transcription of the entire symphony for piano trio which bears the same opus number.

Form

This symphony consists of four movements:
Adagio molto,  – Allegro con brio,  (D major)
Larghetto,  (A major)
Scherzo: Allegro,  (D major)
Allegro molto,  (D major)

A typical performance runs 33 to 36 minutes.

First movement
The Introduction, Adagio molto, begins in D major, changing to B major in measure 11. In measures 12–16, it briefly modulates to B major and immediately back to D. The exposition (Allegro con brio) begins in D major with the A theme lasting until measure 57. A transition towards the B theme lasts until measure 72, modulating to A minor at measure 61. The B theme begins in A major at 73, moving to A minor again at 113 with a codetta from measure 117–136 (moving to D major in measure 120). The development uses material from the A theme, going through several modulations throughout and making use of the main idea from Theme A in sequence. At measure 216, the A theme returns in the recapitulation, lasting until measure 228. There is a transition from 229–244, bringing back the B theme at measure 245, this time in the tonic key. At 327, B major returns briefly, moving back to D in 334 with a Coda from measures 340–360.

Second movement
This movement, Larghetto, is in the dominant key of A major and is one of Beethoven's longest symphonic slow movements. There are clear indications of the influence of folk music and the pastoral, presaging his Symphony No. 6 ("Pastoral").

The movement, like the first, is in sonata form. Franz Schubert quoted from the movement in the second movement of his Grand Duo for piano.

Third movement
This movement, Scherzo: Allegro, encloses a melodious oboe and bassoon quartet within a typical-sounding Austrian side-slapping dance.

Fourth movement
The fourth movement, Allegro molto, is composed of very rapid string passages. Musicologist Robert Greenberg of the San Francisco Conservatory of Music describes the highly unusual opening motif as a hiccup, belch or flatulence followed by a groan of pain. According to Greenberg:

Musicologist and composer Bryan Townsend refers to this assertion by Greenberg as "an example of musicological overreach". Greenberg does not cite any references to reinforce this interpretation he puts forth in his courses "The symphonies of Beethoven" and "How to listen to and understand great music".

Notes

External links
 Complete performance by the Philadelphia Orchestra (interview only)
 
 A visual analysis of the 2nd Symphony

02
Beethoven 02
1801 compositions
Compositions in D major
Music with dedications